Scott Free may refer to:
Scott Free (album), a 1984 album by Max Roach
Scott Free (comics) or Mister Miracle, a DC Comics character
Scott Free Productions, a film production company

See also
 Scot free
 Free (disambiguation)
 Scott (disambiguation)